The Nordic Council Film Prize is an annual film prize administered by the Nordic Council. The Nordisk Film & TV Fond is the funding body that administers the prize.

History
The first award was handed out in 2002 to celebrate the Nordic Council's 50th anniversary. Since 2005 the prize has been annual.

Description
The Nordisk Film & TV Fond is secretariat to the Nordic Council. It is funded by 22 partners: the Nordic Council of Ministers; five national film institutes; and 16 public and private media companies. It also funds the Nordisk Film & TV Fond Prize at the annual Gothenburg Film Festival.

One winner is chosen from submissions from the five Nordic countries.

In 2008, the prize money of the Nordic Council Film Prize was €47,000. According to the Nordic Council, the prize is given for "the creation of an artistically original film that is rooted in Nordic cultural circles".

Prize winners and nominees

See also 

 Nordic Council's Literature Prize
 Nordic Council Music Prize

References

External links 
 The Nordic Council Film Prize Official website
 The Nordic Council Film Prize entry at Norden

2002 establishments in Europe
Awards established in 2002
Finnish film awards
Nordic Council prizes
Norwegian film awards
Swedish film awards
Danish film awards
Icelandic film awards